Abbi Glines (Abigail Glines) is an American New York Times, USA Today, and Wall Street Journal bestselling novelist. Her new-adult fiction titled Fallen Too Far was self-published on eBook and paperback in 2012.

The remaining of the 'Too Far' series, Never Too Far and Forever Too Far had a lot of success with younger audiences. The content of the books is rated 16+ because of its explicit content. Glines is also the author of the initially self-published young adult bestselling series The Vincent Boys.

Glines recently released the last of the 'Too Far' series in the male lead's point of view. The ninth book in the Rosemary Beach series, titled You Were Mine, was released 2014.

Bibliography

The Field Party (series) 
 Until Friday Night (2015)(West and Maggie)
 Under the Lights (2016)(Gunner and Willa)
 After the Game  (2017)(Brady and Riley)
 Losing the Field (2018)(Nash and Tallulah)
 Making a play (2019)(Ryker and Aurora)
 Game Changer  (2022) (Ezmita and Asa)

Rosemary Beach (series) 
 Fallen Too Far (2012) (Blaire Wynn/Rush Finlay) 
 Never Too Far (2013) (Blaire Wynn/Rush Finlay)
 Forever Too Far (2013) (Blaire Finlay/Rush Finlay)
 Rush Too Far (2014) (Fallen Too Far in Rush's POV)  
 Twisted Perfection (2013) (Della Sloane/Woods Kerrington)
 Simple Perfection (2013) (Della Sloane/Woods Kerrington)
 Take a Chance (2014) (Harlow Manning/Grant Carter)
 One More Chance (2014) (Harlow Manning/Grant Carter)
 You Were Mine (2014) (Bethy Lowry/Tripp Newark)
 Kiro's Emily (2014) (Emily/Kiro Manning)
 When I'm Gone (2015) (Reese Ellis/Mase Colt-Manning)
 When You're Back (2015) (Reese Ellis/Mase Colt-Manning)
 The Best Goodbye (2015) (Rose Henderson/River “Captain” Kipling) 
 Up In Flames (2016) (Nan Dillon/Gannon “Copeland” Roth)
 Going Too Far (2022) (Brielle McGinnis/Dean Finlay)

Sea Breeze (series) 
 Breathe (2011) (Jax Stone / Sadie White)
 Because of Low (2012) (Marcus Hardy / Willow "Low" Montgomery)
 While it Lasts (2012) (Cage York / Eva Brooks)
 Just For Now (2012) (Preston Drake / Amanda Hardy)
 Sometimes It Lasts (2013) (Cage York / Eva Brooks)
 Misbehaving (2013) (Jason Stone / Jess Taylor)
 Bad for You (2015) (Krit Corbin / Blythe Denton)
 Hold on Tight (2015) (Dewayne Falco / Sienna Roy)
 Until the End (2016) (Rock Taylor / Trisha Corbin)(Includes Epilogues of the other Sea Breeze books)

Existence Trilogy (series) 
 Existence (2011)
 Predestined (2012)
 Leif (Novella) (2012)
 Ceaseless (2012)

The Vincent Boys (series) 
 The Vincent Boys (2011) (Beau Vincent)(Beau and Ashton)
 The Vincent Brothers (2012) (Sawyer Vincent)(Sawyer and Lana)

Once She Dreamed (series) 
 Once She Dreamed: Part 1 (2016)
 Once She Dreamed: Part 2 (2016)

Sea Breeze Meets Rosemary Beach (series) 
 Like a Memory (2017) (Nate Finlay and Bliss York)
 Because Of Lila (2017) (Lila Kate Carter and Cruz Kerrington)
 Best I’ve Ever Had (2019) (Eli Hardy and Ophelia Finlay)

South of the Mason Dixon (series) 
Boys South of the Mason Dixon (2017)
Brothers South of Mason Dixon
Broken South of Mason Dixon  (2019)

Black Souls series
Charmed Souls

Stand Alone Novels 
 As She Fades(2018) (Vale McKinley and Slate Allen)

References

External links
 

Living people
American women novelists
21st-century American novelists
Writers from Birmingham, Alabama
21st-century American women writers
Novelists from Alabama